Kawmein Pagoda is a pagoda in Myitkyina, Myanmar. It is also known as Myoti Pagoda. In July 2010, Vice-Senior General Maung Aye, and wife Daw Mya Mya San attended ceremony at the pagoda to hoist diamond orbs.

References

Buddhist temples in Myanmar
Myitkyina
21st-century Buddhist temples
Religious buildings and structures completed in 2010